The Carajás Railway (EFC or EF-315) is a railway line linking the cities of Parauapebas, Pará and São Luís, Maranhão, in Brazil. The line is one of the few in Brazil to carry passengers as well as cargo.

It is one of the largest passenger railways in operation in Brazil, with five stations and ten stops, covering São Luís, Santa Inês, Açailândia, Marabá and Parauapebas. However, the EF-315 is specialized in transporting mineral cargo, extracted from the Serra dos Carajás mines, and taken to the ports of São Marcos Bay in Maranhão for export. It transports over 120 million tons of cargo and 350,000 passengers a year.

The EF-315 is also interconnected with two other railway lines: São Luís–Teresina Railway and Norte-Sul Railway. The first crosses states in the Northeast region and the second crosses the states of Maranhão, Tocantins, Goiás, Minas Gerais and São Paulo, facilitating the export of grains and industrialized products through the Port of Itaqui, in São Luís.

References

5 ft 3 in gauge railways in Brazil